Reginald Spencer Stafford CBE FRAeS (21 April 1903 – September 1980) was an aeronautical engineer, and the designer of the Handley Page Victor.

Early life
Reggie Stafford attended Kilburn Grammar School.

Career
He worked for Handley Page, joining in 1926. In 1934 he became chief aerodynamicist, and chief designer in 1945, in charge of the design team. He became Technical Director in 1953. He retired from the company in 1968, after 42 years.

Handley Page Victor
He designed the HP.80 aircraft with Godfrey Henry Lee. The Victor was known for its crescent wing.

The first HP Victor, WB771, was first flown by Sqn Ldr Hedley Hazelden on 24 December 1952 at Radlett. On 2 January 1953, the aircraft was named Victor by the Air Ministry. The first production Victor XA917 first flew on 1 February 1956.

Personal life
He died in Aylesbury in Buckinghamshire in 1980 aged 77. In the 1956 New Year Honours he received the CBE.

References

 The Handley Page Victor: The History & Development of a Classic Jet, Roger Brooks
 Victor Units of the Cold War, Andrew Brookes

See also
 Stuart Davies (engineer), designer of the Avro Vulcan

Commanders of the Order of the British Empire
English aerospace engineers
Fellows of the Royal Aeronautical Society
Handley Page
People educated at Kilburn Grammar School
1903 births
1980 deaths